Abisares is a genus of spur-throated grasshoppers in the family Acrididae. There are at least two described species in Abisares, both found in Africa.

Species
These two species belong to the genus Abisares:
 Abisares depressus Uvarov, 1938
 Abisares viridipennis (Burmeister, 1838) (notched shield grasshopper)

References

External links

 

Acrididae